Uremia is the term for high levels of urea in the blood. Urea is one of the primary components of urine. It can be defined as an excess in the blood of amino acid and protein metabolism end products, such as urea and creatinine, which would be normally excreted in the urine. Uremic syndrome can be defined as the terminal clinical manifestation of kidney failure (also called renal failure). It is the signs, symptoms and results from laboratory tests which result from inadequate excretory, regulatory, and endocrine function of the kidneys. Both uremia and uremic syndrome have been used interchangeably to denote a very high plasma urea concentration that is the result of renal failure. The former denotation will be used for the rest of the article.

Azotemia is a similar, less severe condition with high levels of urea, where the abnormality can be measured chemically but is not yet so severe as to produce symptoms. Uremia describes the pathological and symptomatic manifestations of severe azotemia.

There is no specific time for the onset of uremia for people with progressive loss of kidney function. People with kidney function below 50% (i.e. a glomerular filtration rate [GFR] between 50 and 60 mL/min) and over 30 years of age may have uremia to a degree. This means an estimated 8 million people in the United States with a GFR of less than 60 mL/min have uremic symptoms.  The symptoms, such as fatigue, can be very vague, making the diagnosis of impaired kidney function difficult. Treatment can be by dialysis or a kidney transplant, though some patients choose to pursue symptom control and conservative care instead.

Signs and symptoms
Classical signs of uremia are: progressive weakness and easy fatigue, loss of appetite due to nausea and vomiting, muscle atrophy, tremors, abnormal mental function, frequent shallow respiration, and metabolic acidosis. Without intervention via dialysis or kidney transplant, uremia due to renal failure will progress and cause stupor, coma, and death. Because uremia is mostly a consequence of kidney failure, its signs and symptoms often occur concomitantly with other signs and symptoms of kidney failure.

Glomerular filtration rate (GFR) measures the amount of plasma in millilitres being filtered through the kidneys each minute. As the GFR decreases, the prognosis worsens. Some of the effects can be reversed, albeit temporarily, with dialysis.

Residual syndrome
People on dialysis acquire what is known as "residual syndrome".  Residual syndrome is a non-life-threatening disease which is displayed as toxic effects causing many of the same signs and symptoms that uremia displays. There are several hypotheses why residual syndrome is present. They are:  the accumulation of large molecular weight solutes that are poorly dialyzed (e.g. β2-microglobulin); the accumulation of protein-bound small molecular weight solutes that are poorly dialyzed (e.g. p-cresyl sulfate and indoxyl sulfate); the accumulation of dialyzable solutes that are incompletely removed (e.g. sequestered solutes like phosphate in cells or insufficient elimination of other more toxic solutes); indirect phenomena such as carbamylation of proteins, tissue calcification, or a toxic effect of hormone imbalance (e.g. parathyroid hormone) and; the toxic effects of dialysis itself (e.g. removal of unknown important vitamins or minerals). Dialysis increases life span but patients may have more limited function. They have physical limitations which include impairment of balance, walking speed, and sensory functions. They also have cognitive impairments such as impairment in attention, memory, and performance of higher-order tasks. Patients have been maintained longer than three decades on dialysis, but average mortality rates and hospitalizations are high. Also, patient rehabilitation and quality of life is poor.

Causes

Conditions causing increased blood urea fall into three different categories: prerenal, renal, and postrenal.

Prerenal azotemia can be caused by decreased blood flow through the kidneys (e.g. low blood pressure, congestive heart failure, shock, bleeding, dehydration) or by increased production of urea in the liver via a high protein diet or increased protein catabolism (e.g. stress, fever, major illness, corticosteroid therapy, or gastrointestinal bleeding).

Renal causes can be attributed to decreased kidney function. These include acute and chronic kidney failure, acute and chronic glomerulonephritis, tubular necrosis, and other kidney diseases.

Postrenal causes can be due to decreased elimination of urea. These could be due to urinary outflow obstruction such as by calculi, tumours of the bladder or prostate, or a severe infection.

Diagnosis
A detailed and accurate history and physical examination will help determine if uremia is acute or chronic.  In the cases of acute uremia, causes may be identified and eliminated, leading to a higher chance for recovery of normal kidney function, if treated correctly.

Blood tests
Primary tests performed for the diagnosis of uremia are basic metabolic panel with serum calcium and phosphorus to evaluate the GFR, blood urea nitrogen and creatinine as well as serum potassium, phosphate, calcium and sodium levels. Principal abnormality is very low GFR (<30 mL/min).  Uremia will demonstrate elevation of both urea and creatinine, likely elevated potassium, high phosphate and normal or slightly high sodium, as well as likely depressed calcium levels.  As a basic work up a physician will also evaluate for anemia, and thyroid and parathyroid functions.  Chronic anemia may be an ominous sign of established renal failure.  The thyroid and parathyroid panels will help work up any symptoms of fatigue, as well as determine calcium abnormalities as they relate to uremia versus longstanding or unrelated illness of calcium metabolism.

Urine tests
A 24-hour urine collection for determination of creatinine clearance may be an alternative, although not a very accurate test due to the collection procedure. Another laboratory test that should be considered is urinalysis with microscopic examination for the presence of protein, casts, blood and pH.

Radioisotope tests
The most trusted test for determining GFR is iothalamate clearance. However, it may be cost-prohibitive and time-consuming.  Clinical laboratories generally calculate the GFR with the modification of diet in renal disease (MDRD) formula or the  Cockcroft-Gault formula.

Other
In addition, coagulation studies may indicate prolonged bleeding time with otherwise normal values.

Mechanism
Uremia results in many different compounds being retained by the body. With the failure of the kidneys, these compounds can build up to dangerous levels. There are more than 90 different compounds that have been identified. Some of these compounds can be toxic to the body.

Uremic toxins

Uremic toxins are any biologically active compounds that are retained due to kidney impairment. Many uremic salts can also be uremic toxins.

Urea was one of the first metabolites identified. Its removal is directly related to patient survival but its effect on the body is not yet clear. Still, it is not certain that the symptoms currently associated with uremia are actually caused by excess urea, as one study showed that uremic symptoms were relieved by initiation of dialysis, even when urea was added to the dialysate to maintain the blood urea nitrogen level at approximately 90 mg per deciliter (that is, approximately 32 mmol per liter). Urea could be the precursor of more toxic molecules but it is more likely that damage done to the body is from a combination of different compounds which may act as enzyme inhibitors or derange membrane transport. Indoxyl sulfate is one of the better characterized uremic toxins. Indoxyl sulfate has been shown to aggravate vascular inflammation in atherosclerosis by modulating macrophage behavior.

Biochemical characteristics
Many regulatory functions of the body are affected. Regulation of body fluids, salt retention, acid and nitrogenous metabolite excretion are all impaired and can fluctuate widely. Body fluid regulation is impaired due to a failure to excrete fluids, or due to fluid loss from vomiting or diarrhea. Regulation of salt is impaired when salt intake is low or the vascular volume is inadequate. Acid excretion and nitrogenous metabolite excretion are impaired with the loss of kidney function.

History
Urea was crystallized and identified between 1797 and 1808. Urea was hypothesized to be the source of urinary ammonia during this time and was confirmed in 1817. It was hypothesized that excess urea may lead to specific disorders. Later in 1821, it was confirmed that the body did produce urea and that it was excreted by the kidneys. In 1827, urea was first synthesized in the lab, confirming the composition of urea and making it the first biological substance synthesized. In 1856, urea was produced in vitro via oxidation of proteins. It was in 1827 that Henri Dutrochet seeded the idea of dialysis with the discovery of separating smaller molecules from larger molecules through a semipermeable membrane. It was in 1829 and 1831 when convincing proof was obtained that in certain patients, blood urea was elevated. They also suggested that harm may be caused by this. Later research suggested that major neurological disorders like coma and convulsions did not correlate with physical findings which included generalized edema of the brain. This suggested that uremia was a form of blood poisoning. In 1851, E.T. Frerich described clinical uremic syndrome and suggested that a toxicity was the mechanism of its cause. It was in 1856 that J. Picard developed a sensitive method to reproducibly measure blood urea. He was able to detect a 40% decrease of urea concentration between the renal artery and the renal vein. This work solidified the fact that renal failure coincided with an increase in blood urea. It was J. Picard with E.T. Frerich's work that made the term uremia popular.

Oral manifestations 
Oral symptoms of uremia can be found in up to 90% of renal patients. The patients may present with ammonia-like taste and smell in mouth, stomatitis, gingivitis, decreased salivary flow, xerostomia and parotitis.

One of the early symptoms of renal failure is uremic fetor. It is an ammonia odour in the mouth caused by the high concentration of urea in the saliva which subsequently breaks down to ammonia. As the blood urea nitrogen (BUN) level increases, patient might develop uremic stomatitis. Uremic stomatitis appears as a pseudo membrane or the frank ulcerations with redness and a pultaceous coat in the mouth. These lesions could be related to high BUN level >150 mg/dl and disappear spontaneously when the BUN level is reduced with medical treatment. It is believed to be caused by loss of tissue resistance and failure to withstand traumatic influences. Besides that, the patient may develop a rare manifestation which is uremic frost. It is a white plaque found on the skin or in the mouth, it is caused by residual urea crystals left on the epithelial surface after perspiration and saliva evaporation or as a result of reduced salivary flow. Xerostomia is a common oral finding, it results from a combination of direct involvement of salivary glands, chemical inflammation, dehydration and mouth breathing. It may be due to restricted fluid intake, adverse effect of drug therapy or low salivary rate. Salivary swelling can be seen sometimes.

In patients with renal disease, pallor of the oral mucosa can sometimes be noticed due to anaemia caused by reduction of erythropoietin. Uraemia can lead to alteration of platelet aggregation. This situation, combined with the use of heparin and other anticoagulants in haemodialysis, causes the patients to become predisposed to ecchymosis, petechiae, and haemorrhages in the oral cavity. It can also lead to mucositis and glossitis which can bring about pain and inflammation of the tongue and oral mucosa. In addition, patients might also experience altered taste sensations, dysgeusia, and be predisposed to bacterial and candidiasis infections. Candidiasis is more frequent in renal transplant patients because of generalized immunosuppression.

In children with renal disease, enamel hypoplasia of the primary and permanent dentition has been observed. The abnormalities of dental development correlate with the age at which metabolic disturbances occur. For example, enamel hypoplasia in the form of white or brown discoloration of primary teeth is commonly seen in young children with early-onset renal disease. Poor oral hygiene, a carbohydrate-rich diet, disease-related debilitation, hypoplastic enamel, low salivary flow rate and long-term medication contribute to increased risk of caries formation. However, the patients usually have low caries activity, particularly in children. This is due to the presence of highly buffered and alkaline saliva caused by the high concentration of urea nitrogen and phosphate in saliva. The salivary pH will usually be above the critical pH level for demineralization of the enamel to occur and this helps to prevent the formation of caries. Besides that, pulpal narrowing and calcifications is a frequent finding in patients with renal disease. For patients who are on dialysis, the nausea and vomiting resulting from dialysis treatment may lead to severe tooth erosion.

Dental considerations 
When treating patients with renal insufficiency, a dentist should collect a complete medical history, with particular attention to ESRD-related illnesses, drugs with prescribed dosages, blood parameters, timing, and type of dialysis performed. These aspects can be directly discussed with the nephrologist when necessary. Any alterations in drugs or other aspects of treatment must be previously agreed upon by the nephrologist.

Dental examination for such patients consists of a non-invasive complete assessment of dental, periodontal, and mucosal tissues, with radiographs to aid with the diagnostic process. All potential foci of infection should be intercepted; these include periodontal and endodontic lesions, residual roots, partially erupted and malpositioned third molars, peri-implantitis, and mucosal lesions. When periodontitis is suspected, a periodontal chart should be recorded. Orthodontic appliances can be maintained if they do not interfere with oral hygiene.

Uremia is commonly seen in patients who undergo dialysis due to renal insufficiency. For hemodialysis patients, it is important to determine the treatment schedule. Dental treatment should be started on the day after hemodialysis due to several reasons: there is no accumulation of uremic toxins in the blood, and circulating heparin is absent. Treatment should not commence on the same day as hemodialysis as patients usually feel unwell and their blood is heparinized, which might cause excessive bleeding. For patients undergoing peritoneal dialysis, there are no contraindications to dental treatment except in cases of acute peritoneal infections, where elective procedure should be deferred.

Special care should be taken when positioning the patient, avoiding compression of the arm with the vascular access for hemodialysis. Any injections or blood pressure measurement should not be performed on an arm with an arteriovenous (AV) fistula. If the AV site is located on a leg, the patient should avoid sitting for lengthy periods, as venous drainage may be obstructed. During long dental procedures, the dentist should allow patients with AV sites on their legs to take a brief walk or stand for a while every hour.

Hemostatic aids should be instituted in cases of excessive bleeding, which is commonly seen in uremia and renal failure. To manage postoperative bleeding, primary closure techniques and local hemostatic agents should be used routinely. To reduce bleeding during and after a procedure, tranexamic acid, both as a rinse or administered orally, can be used.

Patients undergoing dialysis are exposed to numerous transfusions and renal failure-related immunosuppression; thus, they are at greater risks of infection by human immunodeficiency virus (HIV) and hepatitis types B and C. It is important to adopt infection control measures to avoid cross-contamination in the dental clinic and prevent risk of exposure to dental personnel.

A majority of medications are eliminated from the body at least partially by the kidney. Due to renal failure, the plasma half-lives of drugs normally excreted in urine will be prolonged, leading to increased toxicity. Many drugs which are normally safely administered cannot be given to patients with reduced renal function. Besides, some drugs can be given, but the dosage must be reduced. However, in patients undergoing dialysis, reduced plasma half-lives of drugs will be observed. Antibiotics of the aminoglycoside and tetracycline families need to be avoided due to their nephrotoxicities. The antibiotics of choice are penicillins, clindamycin, and cephalosporins, which can be administered at normal doses even if the therapeutic range will be extended. For analgesics, paracetamol is the option of choice for cases of episodic pain. Aspirin is characterized by an anti-platelet activity and thus its use should be avoided in uremic patients. The challenge in pharmacotherapy for patients with renal disease is to maintain a medication's therapeutic level within a narrow range in order to avoid subtherapeutic dosing and toxicity.

Notes

References

External links 
 Uremia, WebMD.com

Kidney diseases
Symptoms and signs: Urinary system